Martinville is a municipality within the Coaticook Regional County Municipality of Quebec, Canada.  The population was 469 in the Canada 2011 Census.

Demographics

Population
Population trend:

References

External links

Municipalities in Quebec
Incorporated places in Estrie
Coaticook Regional County Municipality